Peter Sylvester Bosz (born 21 November 1963) is a Dutch professional football manager and former player.

Playing career

Club
A midfielder, Bosz started his professional career played with Vitesse in 1981; after a loan season with then amateurs AGOVV Apeldoorn in 1984, he returned into professional football with RKC Waalwijk (from 1985 to 1988), then moving to France with SC Toulon (1988 to 1991), and successively playing six seasons with Dutch giants Feyenoord (1991 to 1996), Japanese club JEF United Ichihara (1996–97), German club Hansa Rostock (1997–98), NAC Breda (1998–99). He retired at the end of the year 1999 after a second spell with JEF United Ichihara.

International
Bosz made his debut for the Netherlands in a December 1991 Euro qualification match against Greece and earned eight caps, scoring no goals. His final international was in 1995 against the Czech Republic. He was part of the Dutch squad at UEFA Euro 1992.

Managerial career

Entering management
After his retirement, Bosz started a career in management, first becoming head coach of amateurs AGOVV Apeldoorn, a position he held from January 2000 to 2002. In 2002 he also won a national amateur league title.

De Graafschap
Bosz made his move into professional football in 2002, becoming head coach of De Graafschap (2002–2003). The team finished last in the 2002–03 Eredivisie and was relegated to the Eerste Divisie.

Heracles Almelo
Bosz next became manager of Heracles Almelo (2004–2006). He won the 2004–05 Eerste Divisie with the club and promoted with them to the Eredivisie. Bosz' Heracles secured their Eredivisie promotion the following year, finishing 13th in the 2005–06 Eredivisie.

Feyenoord (technical director)
In July 2006, Bosz accepted an offer as technical director at his former club Feyenoord. Whilst at the club he was responsible for completing the signings of (amongst others) Giovanni van Bronckhorst, Roy Makaay, Tim de Cler, Kevin Hofland and Denny Landzaat. He left the position on 14 January 2009 due to his opposition to the dismissal of head coach Gertjan Verbeek.

Return to Heracles
In the summer of 2010, Bosz started his second spell as manager of Heracles Almelo, replacing Verbeek who had moved to AZ Alkmaar in the meantime. The team finished 8th in the 2010–11 Eredivisie, securing qualification for the European competition Playoffs, where they were eliminated by FC Groningen. Heracles finished 12th in the 2011–12 Eredivisie and 2012–13 Eredivisie. He left the club in 2013.

Vitesse

On 19 June 2013, Bosz was appointed as manager of his old club Vitesse on a two-year contract. Bosz replaced outgoing manager Fred Rutten whose contract had expired. In November 2013, Vitesse was top of the league in the Eredivisie for the first time since 2006. It was the first time since 2000 they'd been top of the league later than the first week. Halfway through the season, after 17 matches, Vitesse was the leader in the competition. The team finished 2013–14 season in sixth place. The following season, Vitesse finished fifth, qualifying for the European competition play-offs. Also, Bosz was nominated for the Rinus Michels Award (for manager of the year), but lost to Phillip Cocu, who had led PSV Eindhoven to the Eredivisie title. In the 2015–16 season, Vitesse was in fifth place in the winter break, after which Bosz left the club.

Maccabi Tel Aviv
In January 2016 Bosz was announced as the new head coach of Israeli champions Maccabi Tel Aviv. Bosz left Tel Aviv in May 2016 for Dutch team AFC Ajax. During his time in Israel, Bosz was undefeated in 19 games in charge, with 12 wins and 7 draws.However, Tel Aviv lost the title to Hapoel Be'er Sheva and Lost in the Israeli cup final to Maccabi Haifa.

AFC Ajax
In May 2016, AFC Ajax announced that Bosz was appointed to serve as the new head coach from July 2016 after signing a three-year contract. In his first competitive match as head coach, Bosz's side earned a 1–1 draw against PAOK in the Third qualifying round of the Champions League on 27 July 2016. Bosz was unable to lead Ajax to the group stage of the Champions League after losing 5–2 on aggregate to Russian side FC Rostov. On 11 September 2016, Bosz faced his former side Vitesse, as Ajax won 1–0.  On 24 May 2017 Ajax were beaten 2–0 at Friends Arena, Stockholm in the Europa League final by Manchester United.

Borussia Dortmund
On 6 June 2017, it was announced that Peter Bosz would transfer to German club Borussia Dortmund. Since there was no buy-out clause in his contract with his previous club, Ajax received nearly €5 million for compensation in order to buy out his contract. It was a record buyout of a head coach for a German club, breaking the previous record of €4 million.

After no wins in their Champions League group stage, Dortmund dropped into the Europa League. On 10 December 2017, Bosz was sacked and replaced by Peter Stöger.

Bayer Leverkusen
On 23 December 2018, he was appointed as the new head coach of Bayer Leverkusen. After his appointment Leverkusen's form improved significantly leading to Leverkusen securing UEFA Champions League qualification in the final game of the season. Bosz was sacked in March 2021 after the team dropped to sixth place with seven points to direct UEFA Champions League qualification.

Olympique Lyonnais
On 29 May 2021, Bosz was appointed as the head coach of French side Lyon and signed a two-year contract, replacing Rudi Garcia.

On 9 October 2022, Bosz was sacked 10 matches into the season with Lyon in 9th place in Ligue 1. He was replaced by Laurent Blanc.

Coaching style
Bosz favours an attacking style of play, based on ball possession and aggressive pressing. Furthermore, Bosz's tactical ideas are heavily influenced by the football of Johan Cruyff.

As a result of this attacking style, Bosz has changed the positions of many of his players. Bosz won plaudits for his conversion of Lasse Schone, who played on the wing for Frank de Boer into the holding midfield position, utilising Schone's technique to enhance Ajax's build-up play. Furthermore, Julian Brandt, was moved from the position of left-winger under Heiko Herrlich into a central attacking midfield position by Bosz, which resulted in a significant upturn in form.

However, Bosz's style does have its detractors. His failure at Dortmund was partly credited to a perceived idealistic attacking approach which left Dortmund continuously vulnerable to the counter-attack.

Career statistics

Club

International

Managerial

Honours

Player
Feyenoord
Eredivisie: 1992–93
KNVB Cup: 1991–92, 1993–94, 1994–95

Manager
AGOVV
Hoofdklasse: 2002

Heracles Almelo
Eerste Divisie: 2004–05

Ajax
UEFA Europa League runner up: 2016–17

Bayer Leverkusen
DFB Pokal runner up: 2019–20

Individual
Rinus Michels Award: 2017

References

External links

1963 births
Living people
Sportspeople from Apeldoorn
Dutch footballers
Association football midfielders
SBV Vitesse players
AGOVV Apeldoorn players
RKC Waalwijk players
SC Toulon players
Feyenoord players
JEF United Chiba players
FC Hansa Rostock players
NAC Breda players
Eredivisie players
Eerste Divisie players
Ligue 1 players
J1 League players
Bundesliga players
Netherlands international footballers
UEFA Euro 1992 players
Dutch expatriate footballers
Dutch expatriate sportspeople in France
Dutch expatriate sportspeople in Japan
Dutch expatriate sportspeople in Germany
Dutch expatriate sportspeople in Israel
Expatriate footballers in France
Expatriate footballers in Japan
Expatriate footballers in Germany
Dutch football managers
AGOVV Apeldoorn managers
De Graafschap managers
Feyenoord non-playing staff
Heracles Almelo managers
SBV Vitesse managers
Maccabi Tel Aviv F.C. managers
AFC Ajax managers
Borussia Dortmund managers
Bayer 04 Leverkusen managers
Olympique Lyonnais managers
Eredivisie managers
Eerste Divisie managers
Israeli Premier League managers
Bundesliga managers
Ligue 1 managers
Rinus Michels Award winners
Dutch expatriate football managers
Expatriate football managers in Germany
Expatriate football managers in Israel
Footballers from Gelderland